Year 352 (CCCLII) was a leap year starting on Wednesday (link will display the full calendar) of the Julian calendar. At the time, it was known as the Year of the Consulship of Decentius and Paulus (or, less frequently, year 1105 Ab urbe condita). The denomination 352 for this year has been used since the early medieval period, when the Anno Domini calendar era became the prevalent method in Europe for naming years.

Events 
 By place 
 Roman Empire 
 Emperor Constantius II invades northern Italy in pursuit of the usurper Magnus Magnentius, who withdraws with his army to Gaul. He declares an amnesty for Magnentius' soldiers, many of whom desert to him. 
 By the end of the year Constantius enters Milan.
 The Alamanni and the Franks cross the Rhine and defeat the depleted Roman units left at the frontier. The Germans take control of around 40 towns and cities between the Moselle and the Rhine.
 Constantius Gallus sends his general (magister equitum) Ursicinus to forcefully put down the Jewish revolt in Palestine. The rebels destroy the cities Diopolis and Tiberias, while Diocesarea is razed to the ground. Ursicinus gives the order to kill thousands of Jews, even children. After the revolt, a permanent garrison is stationed in Galilee.

 Asia 
 War begins between the Huns and the Alans.
 Ran Wei is destroyed by a Xianbei invasion, which also reaches the Yangtze River in the territory of the Jin Dynasty.

 By topic 
 Art and Science 
 The earliest sighting of a supernova occurs in China.

 Religion 
 May 17 – Pope Julius I dies after a 15-year reign in which he has made himself the chief opponent of Arianism. He is succeeded by Pope Liberius as the 36th pope, who immediately writes to Constantius II requesting a council at Aquileia to discuss the former Alexandrian patriarch Athanasius, who opposes the Arian belief to which the emperor subscribes.

Births 
 Arsenius the Great, anchorite and Desert Father (approximate date)

Deaths  
 April 12 – Julius I, bishop of Rome
 June 1 – Ran Min, Chinese emperor "Heavenly King" (Tian Wang)
 Yao Yizhong, Chinese general and warlord (b. 280)

References